Euan MacMillan Kirkwood (born 7 December 1934) is a Scottish former first-class cricketer.

Kirkwood was born at Paisley in December 1934 and was educated at Merchiston Castle School. A club cricketer for Ferguslie, Kirkwood made three appearances in first-class cricket for Scotland in 1958, against Yorkshire at Middlesbrough, the touring New Zealanders at Glasgow, and Ireland at Ayr. He struggled with the bat in these three matches, scoring 17 runs at an average of 3.40. He later emigrated to Canada, where he settled in British Columbia. He continued to play cricket in Canada as a wicket-keeper, representing British Columbia.

References

External links
 

1934 births
Living people
People from Paisley, Renfrewshire
People educated at Merchiston Castle School
Scottish cricketers
Scottish emigrants to Canada